Rose-Maïté Erkoreka (born July 11, 1976) is a Canadian actress and playwright from Quebec. She is most noted for her performance in the 2013 film Louis Cyr (Louis Cyr, l'homme le plus fort du monde), for which she received a Jutra Award nomination for Best Actress at the 16th Jutra Awards in 2014.

A graduate of the Conservatoire d'art dramatique de Montréal, she has also appeared in the films The Barbarian Invasions (Les Invasions barbares), Nouvelles, nouvelles and Waiting for April (En attendant avril), and the television series Providence, Les Hauts et les bas de Sophie Paquin, Une grenade avec ça?, Trauma and District 31.

Her first theatrical play, Souveraines, premiered at Montreal's Théâtre de Quat'Sous in 2018.

References

External links

1976 births
Living people
21st-century Canadian actresses
21st-century Canadian dramatists and playwrights
21st-century Canadian women writers
Canadian film actresses
Canadian stage actresses
Canadian television actresses
Canadian dramatists and playwrights in French
Canadian women dramatists and playwrights
French Quebecers
Actresses from Montreal
Writers from Montreal